Khanqah-e Alvaj (also Romanized as Khānqāh-e Alvāj; also known as Khāneqāh and Khānqāh-e Alvāch) is a village in Rowzeh Chay Rural District, in the Central District of Urmia County, West Azerbaijan Province, Iran. At the 2006 census, its population was 1,790, in 387 families.

References 

Populated places in Urmia County